Eva Ollikainen (born 12 February 1982, Espoo) is a Finnish conductor. 

In 2019, Ollikainen was appointed chief conductor and artistic director of the Iceland Symphony Orchestra, in a four year contract to commence with the 2021 season.

Early life and education
Ollikainen began piano studies at age 3, and also learned the violin and French horn. She started conducting studies by age 12. She attended the Sibelius Academy from 1994 to 2002 and graduated in 2002 with a Master of Music Degree in piano. She studied conducting with Jorma Panula and Leif Segerstam. Ollikainen has been a member of the Finnish contemporary ensemble Uusinta, and has premiered several works of Finnish composers.

Career
In 2003, Ollikainen won the second Jorma Panula Conductors' Competition. She first guest-conducted the Iceland Symphony Orchestra in 2005. In the summer of 2006, she was a Tanglewood Music Center conducting fellow, the only fellow that year who already had agency representation. She returned as guest conductor with the Iceland Symphony Orchestra on three occasions between 2007 and 2010, and once again in February 2019.

In June 2017, the Nordic Chamber Orchestra (Nordiska Kammarorkestern) announced the appointment of Ollikainen as its next chief conductor, effective with the 2018-2019 season, with an initial contract of 3 seasons. This appointment marked Ollikainen's first chief conductorship, and she is the first female conductor to be named to this post. 

In June 2019, the Iceland Symphony Orchestra announced the appointment of Ollikainen as its next chief conductor and artistic advisor, effective with the 2020-2021 season, with an initial contract through 2024. According to the contract, she was involved in at least four weeks during the season at Harpa Concert Hall, and involved with international tours. Ollikainen was the first female conductor to be named ISO chief conductor. In November 2019, the Orchestra della Toscana also announced the appointment of Ollikainen as its next principal conductor, the first female conductor to be named to the post, effective with the 2020-2021 season.

References

External links
 Eva Ollikainen's homepage (English)
 Karsten Witt agency German-language page on Eva Ollikainen

Finnish conductors (music)
1982 births
Women conductors (music)
21st-century conductors (music)
Living people
Finnish expatriates in Iceland
21st-century Finnish women musicians
21st-century Finnish musicians
People from Espoo
Sibelius Academy alumni